The Armadale was an English automobile manufactured from 1906 to 1907 by Armadale Motors Ltd, Northwood, Middlesex, then Northwood Motor & Engineering Works, also of Northwood.

Models

Three wheel
Initially called the Toboggan, the Armadale Tri-car, so-called  the "perfect little three-wheeler" featured infinitely variable friction drive and a pressed steel chassis, unusual in a tricar. It used either a one-cylinder Aster or a 2-cylinder Fafnir engine.

Four wheel
In 1906, the company listed a conventional 4-wheeler with a 16 hp 4-cylinder engine.

Tourist Trophy Race of 1906
An Armadale car, owned or driven by A.C. Godwin Smith, was entered in the Tourist Trophy Race in the Isle of Man on 27 September 1906 but it did not start.

See also
 List of car manufacturers of the United Kingdom

References

Brass Era vehicles
Defunct motor vehicle manufacturers of England
Vehicle manufacture in London